Siberian State Technological University is the oldest university in Krasnoyarsk, Russia. It was established in 1930 as the Siberian Institute of Forest (Сибирский лесотехнический институт). Later it was known as the Siberian Technical Institute of Forest (Сибирский лесотехнический институт) (renamed 1933), Siberian Technological Institute (Сибирский технологический институт) (renamed 1958), Krasnoyarsk State Technological Academy (Красноярская государственная технологическая академия) (renamed 1994) and finally the Siberian State Technological University (renamed 1997).

Currently 15,000 students are studying in one of the nine faculties.

See also
List of forestry universities and colleges

Universities in Krasnoyarsk Krai
Universities and institutes established in the Soviet Union
Educational institutions established in 1930
1930 establishments in the Soviet Union
Technical universities and colleges in Russia